Siremar (Sicilia Regionale Marittima) is an Italian shipping company, until 2011 a subdivision of state-owned Tirrenia di Navigazione and now privatized, which operates in routes from Sicily to Aeolian Islands, Aegadian Islands, Ustica, Pantelleria, Linosa and Lampedusa. It also connects Milazzo, Naples and the Eolie Islands.

Fleet

Ships

Hydrofoils 
(From 2016 belonging to Liberty Lines)

Routes
Naples↔Stromboli↔Ginostra↔Panarea↔Rinella↔Santa Marina Salina↔Lipari↔Vulcano↔Milazzo (Ferry route, Laurana)
Milazzo↔Vulcano↔Lipari↔Santa Marina Salina↔Rinella↔Filicudi↔Alicudi (ferry route, Pietro Novelli)
Milazzo↔Vulcano↔Lipari↔Santa Marina Salina↔Rinella↔Panarea↔Ginostra↔Stromboli (ferry route, Isola di Stromboli / Pietro Novelli)
Milazzo↔Vulcano↔Lipari↔Santa Marina Salina↔Rinella↔Filicudi↔Alicudi (hydrofoil route)
Milazzo ↔ Vulcano ↔ Lipari ↔ Santa Marina Salina↔Rinella↔Panarea↔Ginostra↔Stromboli (hydrofoil route)
Trapani↔Favignana↔Levanzo↔Marettimo
Palermo↔Ustica
Trapani↔Pantelleria
Porto Empedocle↔Linosa
Porto Empedocle↔Lampedusa

External links

 Official website
Transport companies established in 1975
1975 establishments in Italy
Shipping companies of Italy
Ferry companies of Italy
Transport in Sicily
Tirrenia Compagnia Italiana di Navigazione